William Thirlaway (1 October 1896 – 1983) was an English professional footballer who played as an outside left. He scored 29 goals from 216 appearances in the Football League.

Thirlaway was born in Washington, which was then in County Durham. He began his career at non-league side Usworth Colliery before moving into league football when he signed for West Ham United in 1921. He spent three years at the club before moving to Southend United in 1924. His stay at the club was short and he went on to play for another three clubs in the next two years, namely Luton Town, South Shields and Birmingham.

In March 1927 he joined Cardiff City, making his debut in a 2–2 draw with Sunderland. Thirlaway had joined the club during the season that they would go on to win the FA Cup, but he was unable to play any part in the triumph as he had made an appearance in the competition for Birmingham before joining Cardiff. He was able to play in the Charity Shield win, when Cardiff beat Corinthians 2–1. He left the club at the end of the 1928–29 season and returned to non-league football with Tunbridge Wells Rangers.

Honours
Cardiff City
FA Charity Shield winner: 1927
Welsh Cup winner: 1928
Welsh Cup finalist: 1929

References

1896 births
1983 deaths
People from Washington, Tyne and Wear
Footballers from Tyne and Wear
Association football outside forwards
English footballers
Usworth Colliery A.F.C. players
West Ham United F.C. players
Southend United F.C. players
Luton Town F.C. players
South Shields F.C. (1889) players
Birmingham City F.C. players
Cardiff City F.C. players
Tunbridge Wells F.C. players
English Football League players
Date of death missing